St Marys Church is a Roman Catholic parish church in Worksop, Nottinghamshire, England. It was built from 1838 to 1840 by Weightman and Hadfield in the Gothic Revival style. It is located on Park Street to the south of the town centre. It was paid for by Bernard Howard, 12th Duke of Norfolk after the sale of Worksop Manor and was once visited by Archduke Franz Ferdinand. It is a Grade II listed building.

History

Foundation
After the Reformation , in the early eighteenth century, local Catholics in Worksop had to go a chapel in Worksop Manor to celebrate Mass. In 1743, it was recorded that the total number of Catholics in Worksop was 23. In 1748, a priest was resident there at Worksop Manor. Around 1780, Charles Howard, 10th Duke of Norfolk paid for a Catholic chapel and a presbytery in Sandhill Dyke. The building survives today as Park Farm.

Construction
In 1838, Bernard Howard, 12th Duke of Norfolk sold Worksop Manor to Henry Pelham-Clinton, 6th Duke of Newcastle for £375,000. That year he paid for the construction of the current church and presbytery. On 29 October 1838, the foundation stone was laid by  Michael Ellison, the duke's agent and uncle of Matthew Ellison Hadfield, one the church's architect, the other being John Grey Weightman. On 26 February 1840, the church was opened by Bishop Thomas Walsh, the Vicar Apostolic of the Midland District. The church was designed in the Gothic Revival style.

Developments
In 1870, Henry Fitzalan-Howard, 15th Duke of Norfolk paid for the church to be improved and added a new sacristy, confessional and heating system. The architect of the improvements was again Matthew Ellison Hadfield. In late 1913, Archduke Franz Ferdinand and his wife Sophie, Duchess of Hohenberg were invited to stay at nearby Welbeck Abbey for a week by William Cavendish-Bentinck, 6th Duke of Portland and attended Mass in the church. On 24 March 1926, the church was consecrated. In 2012, the National Lottery Heritage Fund gave £110,000 to the church for repairs.

Parish
In 2007, the parish was merged with nearby St Joseph's Church in Worksop. It is now the parish of St Jude and includes St Mary's Church, St Joseph's Church and St Helen's Church in Oldcotes. St Mary's Church has one Sunday Mass at 11:00am. St Joseph's Church has one Sunday Mass at 6:00pm on Saturday and St Helen's Church in Oldcotes has one Sunday Mass at 9:00am.

Exterior

See also
 Diocese of Hallam
 Listed buildings in Worksop

References

External links
 

Worksop
Grade II listed churches in Nottinghamshire
Grade II listed Roman Catholic churches in England
Gothic Revival architecture in Nottinghamshire
Gothic Revival church buildings in England
19th-century Roman Catholic church buildings in the United Kingdom
1840 establishments in England
Roman Catholic churches completed in 1840
Roman Catholic Diocese of Hallam
Roman Catholic churches in Nottinghamshire